Wilmer Daniel Fuentes Alvarenga (born 21 April 1992) is a Honduran footballer who plays as a midfielder for Platense. He made his debut for Marathon in 2009 just at the age of 17 under the name of Manuel keosseian He is known for his great tackling and marking abilities as a great defensive midfielder.

Early life
Fuentes was born on 21 April 1992 to Guermillo Fuentes, father and Antonia Alvarenga, mother and has two more siblings and has a cousin named Milton Josue Arriaga who is a singer and songwriter.

International career
Fuentes played at the 2009 FIFA U-17 World Cup in Nigeria. In 2013, he was included in Honduras' squad for the 2013 CONCACAF Gold Cup.

Honours and awards

Club
C.D. Marathón
Liga Profesional de Honduras: 2009–10 A, 2017–18 C
Honduran Cup: 2017

References

External links

 

1992 births
Living people
People from Yoro Department
Association football midfielders
Honduran footballers
Honduras international footballers
C.D. Marathón players
Platense F.C. players
Liga Nacional de Fútbol Profesional de Honduras players
2013 CONCACAF Gold Cup players
2014 Copa Centroamericana players
Honduras youth international footballers
Honduras under-20 international footballers